Union Mills is an unincorporated community in Rutherford County, North Carolina, United States. Union Mills has a post office with ZIP code 28167.

References

Unincorporated communities in Rutherford County, North Carolina
Unincorporated communities in North Carolina